Charles Alfred Matley (1866–1947) was a British paleontologist and geologist in India, the British West Indies and Wales.

Matley was educated at Birmingham University, and earned a doctorate in geology (D.Sc.) from the University of London in July 1902.

In the 1930s, Matley was appointed Government Geologist for Jamaica and under his tenure a ground water assessment for the island was prepared.  In addition, while on the island he collected one of the most extensive collection of Jamaican fossils.

Matley was awarded the Murchison Medal in 1929 by the Geological Society of London. The standard author abbreviation Matley is used to indicate this individual as the author when citing a formal faunal record.

He married Sarah A. Loach in Birmingham in 1891.

Notes

Further reading
Donovan, S.K. (1996) "De la Beche, C. A. Matley and the Jamaican 'Palaeozoic'" Contributions to Geology, UWI, Mona 2: pp. 15–19
Robinson, E. (1996) "Charles Alfred Matley: his links with mid twentieth century geology in Jamaica" Contributions to Geology, UWI, Mona 2: pp. 20–27

External links
List of the publications of Charles Alfred Matley

1866 births
1947 deaths
British geologists
British zoologists